Royal Park Football Club was an Australian rules football founded at a meeting held at the Brecknock Hotel, King William Street, Adelaide on the 24 March 1880.

On 4 April 1882 the South Australian Football Association held a meeting after inviting additional clubs to join the competition. Only one application was received, from the Royal Park Football Club, and the Association agreed to include them in the competition for the upcoming 1882 SAFA season with 19 votes for to 4 votes against.

Royal Park only played five matches in the 1882 SAFA season before folding, with their remaining five matches forfeited. The team kicked just 2 goals in their 5 games conceding 24 goals. The club prominent members were welcomed to join the South Park.

References

Former South Australian National Football League clubs
Australian rules football clubs in South Australia